Geng Jun (born 1976) is a Chinese independent filmmaker. His films have shown at festivals in China and internationally, such as Youth, which was entered at the 2009 Rome Film Festival, The Hammer and Sickle Are Sleeping (2016 Tromsø International Film Festival), and Free and Easy, which was entered at the 2017 Sundance Film Festival.

References

External links

1976 births
Living people
Film directors from Heilongjiang
Chinese film directors